Gerre de' Caprioli (Cremunés:  or ) is a comune (municipality) in the Province of Cremona in the Italian region Lombardy, located about  southeast of Milan and about  south of Cremona.

Gerre de' Caprioli borders the following municipalities: Castelvetro Piacentino, Cremona, Stagno Lombardo.

References

Cities and towns in Lombardy